Phagwara Junction railway station is located on Ambala–Attari line in Kapurthala district in the Indian state of Punjab and serves the textile town of Phagwara.

The railway station

History
The Scinde, Punjab & Delhi Railway completed the -long Amritsar–Ambala–Saharanpur–Ghaziabad line in 1870 connecting Multan (now in Pakistan) with Delhi.

Electrification
The Phillaur–Phagwara sector was electrified in 2002–03, and the Phagwara–Jallandhar City–Amritsar sector in 2003–04.

References

External links
Trains at Phagwara

Railway stations in Kapurthala district
Firozpur railway division